Peter Francis Judge (10 May 1916, Cricklewood, Middlesex – 4 March 1992, Camden, London) was an English cricketer. He was a right-arm fast-medium bowler and played for Middlesex and Glamorgan. In a career spanning 14 years, he appeared in 68 first-class matches. He is notable in cricket history for having recorded the fastest pair ever, at Cardiff Arms Park against the visiting Indians in 1946. He was dismissed by two consecutive balls within the space of a minute, when his captain decided to reverse the batting order, having been forced to follow on.

External links
 Cricinfo biography
 Scorecard of Glamorgan v India match at Cardiff in 1946

English cricketers
Glamorgan cricketers
Middlesex cricketers
London Counties cricketers
Europeans cricketers
Bengal cricketers
1916 births
1992 deaths
H. D. G. Leveson Gower's XI cricketers